The Balmoral bonnet (in Scottish English or Balmoral cap otherwise, and formerly called the Kilmarnock bonnet) is a traditional Scottish hat that can be worn as part of formal or informal Highland dress. Developed from the earlier blue bonnet, dating to at least the 16th century, it takes the form of a knitted, soft wool cap with a flat crown. It is named after Balmoral Castle, a royal residence in Scotland.  It is an alternative to the similar and related (informal) Tam o' Shanter cap and the (formal or informal) Glengarry bonnet.

Design
Originally with a voluminous crown, today, the bonnet is smaller, made of finer cloth, and tends to be dark blue, black, or lovat green. Ribbons in or attached to the back of the band (originally used to secure the bonnet tightly) are sometimes worn hanging from the back of the cap. A regimental or clan badge is worn on the left-hand side, affixed to a silk or grosgrain ribbon cockade (usually black, white, or red), with the bonnet usually worn tilted to the right to display this emblem. The centre of the crown features a toorie, traditionally red.  Some versions have a diced band (usually red and white check) around the lower edge's circumference.

History

As worn by Scottish Highland regiments, the blue bonnet gradually developed into a stiffened felt cylinder, often decorated with an ostrich plume hackle sweeping over the crown from left to right (as well as flashes of bearskin or painted turkey hackles). In the 19th century, this tall cap evolved into the extravagant full dress feather bonnet while, as an undress cap, the plainer form continued in use until the mid-19th century.  By then known as the Kilmarnock bonnet, it was officially replaced by the Glengarry bonnet, which had been in use unofficially since the late eighteenth century and was essentially a folding version of the cylindrical military cap.

The name "Balmoral", as applied to this traditional headdress, appears to date from the late 19th century, and in 1903 a  bluebonnet in traditional style but with a stiffened crown was adopted briefly by some Lowland regiments as full dress headgear. After the Second World War, while all other Scottish regiments chose the Glengarry, a soft blue Balmoral was adopted as full dress headgear by the Black Watch (Royal Highland Regiment) and was worn with the green no. 1 dress jacket and with khaki no. 2 or service dress. As part of the amalgamation of the Scottish regiments in 2006, the military Balmoral was done away with all battalions of the Royal Regiment of Scotland now wear the Glengarry.

Use of the Balmoral has been championed by songwriter Richard Thompson, who uses it on stage, in addition to its traditional place in Highland dress.

North American usage
All Canadian highland regiments, ex. The 48th Highlanders of Canada, the Nova Scotia Highlanders and the Queen's Own Cameron Highlanders of Canada, as well as the officers, warrant officers and senior Non-Commissioned Officers of The Calgary Highlanders wear the Balmoral. It has also been recorded as being worn unofficially by Confederate soldiers in the American Civil War.

Other usage
The Hong Kong Police Band bagpipes section wears a black and red version.

The Balmoral is widely used as a part of a uniform in Army Cadets and pipe band. It is also used as an element of formal highland dress.

References

Bonnets (headgear)
British Army equipment
Caps
Military of Scotland
Military uniforms
Scottish clothing